Eusebius Joseph Beltran (born August 31, 1934) is an American prelate of the Roman Catholic Church.  He served as archbishop of the Archdiocese of Oklahoma City in Oklahoma from 1993 until 2010. He previously served as bishop of the Diocese of Tulsa in Oklahoma from 1978 to 1992.

Beltran was ordained in 1960 and did pastoral and curial work in the Archdiocese of Atlanta until 1978. He also participated in the Selma to Montgomery marches in 1965 during the civil rights movement.

Biography

Early life 
Eusebius Beltran was born on August 31, 1934, in Ashley, Pennsylvania, to Joseph and Helen (née Kozlowski) Beltran. His father was a Spanish immigrant and coal miner, who later died of black lung disease. The fifth of eight children, Beltran has two siblings who entered the religious life as well; one brother also became a priest and one sister became a nun, taking the religious name Sister Sponsa and working as a missionary in Liberia. Eusebius Beltran was raised in Wilkes Barre and attended Marymount School. He took the name Joseph as his confirmation name.

Beltran's father later moved the family to Georgia in search of employment. Aspiring to become a missionary, Eusebius Beltran became a seminarian for the Diocese of Savannah following his graduation from high school. Beltran returned to Pennsylvania for eight years, studying at St. Charles Borromeo Seminary in Philadelphia.

Priesthood 
Beltran was ordained to the priesthood by Bishop Francis Hyland on May 14, 1960, for the Diocese of Atlanta. Beltran then did pastoral and curial work in the Atlanta diocese (raised to archdiocese in 1962) until 1978. He also participated in the Selma to Montgomery marches in 1965 during the civil rights movement.

Bishop of Tulsa 
On February 28, 1978, Beltran was appointed Bishop of Tulsa, Oklahoma, by Pope Paul VI. He was consecrated on April 20 by Archbishop Charles Salatka, with Archbishop Thomas Donnellan and Bishop  Andrew McDonald serving as co-consecrators. His mother, Helen, died shortly afterwards.

Most notable among his charity work were his efforts to assist persons in need, including unwed mothers, HIV/AIDS victims, homeless families, and women who had just been released from prison.

Archbishop of Oklahoma City
On November 24, 1992, Beltran was elevated to the position of Archbishop of Oklahoma City by Pope John Paul II. He was installed on January 22, 1993.  Beltran became the official publisher of the Sooner Catholic, a bi-monthly newspaper for Catholics in Oklahoma. Beltran's sermons were featured in each number of the newspaper during his reign.

In 1999, Catholic priest James Francis Rapp was arrested and pleaded no contest to sexually abusing two boys in Duncan, Oklahoma.  During a subsequent civil trial, it was discovered that Beltran knew about Rapp's prior history of abuse as early as 1994.  Beltran received medical documents and psychiatric evaluations of Rapp that advised the priest should not be allowed to work with children.

In 2009, Beltran expressed his opposition to President Barack Obama giving the commencement speech at and receiving an honorary degree from the University of Notre Dame in Notre Dame, Indiana, saying, "President Obama, by word and action, has approved of abortion and other atrocities against human life. Therefore he deserves no recognition at a Catholic institution."

Retirement and legacy 
Upon reaching his 75th birthday in 2009, Beltran submitted to the Vatican a letter of resignation, as required by Catholic canon law.  His request was accepted by Pope Benedict XVI on December 16, 2010, during a press conference at which his successor, Bishop Paul Stagg Coakley of the Diocese of Salina, Kansas, was introduced.

See also
 

 Catholic Church hierarchy
 Catholic Church in the United States
 Historical list of the Catholic bishops of the United States
 List of Catholic bishops of the United States
 Lists of patriarchs, archbishops, and bishops
 Roman Catholic Church
 Roman Catholic Archdiocese of Oklahoma City
 Roman Catholic Diocese of Tulsa
 Sooner Catholic

References

External links
 Homepage of the Archdiocese of Oklahoma
 Brief biography of Archbishop Beltran
 Homepage of The Sooner Catholic Online.
 Archive of Homilies of Archbishop Beltran

Episcopal succession

1934 births
Living people
People from Ashley, Pennsylvania
American people of Spanish descent
Roman Catholic bishops of Tulsa
Roman Catholic archbishops of Oklahoma City
20th-century Roman Catholic archbishops in the United States
21st-century Roman Catholic archbishops in the United States
Catholics from Pennsylvania